The 1997 PGA of Japan Tour season was played from 13 March to 14 December. The season consisted of 36 official money events in Japan.

Schedule
The following table lists official events during the 1997 season.

Money list
The money list was based on prize money won during the season, calculated in Japanese yen.

Notes

References

External links

Japan Golf Tour
PGA of Japan Tour
PGA of Japan Tour